Keith Pascoe (born 1959) is a musician and conductor from Liverpool, England, best known for his work with musical ensembles such as the Chamber Orchestra of Europe, the London Philharmonic, and the RTÉ Vanbrugh String Quartet.

Background
Born in Liverpool, Pascoe studied violin with Jaroslav Vanecek, piano with Eileen Reynolds, and conducting with Norman Del Mar at the Royal College of Music in London.  He holds first-class honours degrees (MA and Master of Philosophy) from both Cork Institute of Technology and NUI, University College Cork respectively, and received an Hon. ARAM from the Royal Academy of Music in London. In 2016 he received the Lifetime Achievement Award from the National Concert Hall in Ireland. He currently lives in Cork, Ireland.

Career
Pascoe's professional life began in 1981, when he became a founding member (and leader) of the Chamber Orchestra of Europe. Subsequent full-time positions included sub-leader of the London Philharmonic at the age of twenty-three, assistant director of the Academy of St Martin in the Fields (with whom he has appeared as soloist), and ten years with exclusive EMI artists, the Britten Quartet.

Since 1998, Pascoe has been a violinist with the Vanbrugh Quartet, artists-in-residence to University College Cork. He is Lecturer in Chamber Music and Violin at the Dublin Institute of Technology, Conservatory of Music, and Conductor of the Cork Fleischmann Symphony Orchestra.

Recent works
More recently, in addition to having a busy international schedule, Pascoe has been researching the music of the eighteenth-century composer Luigi Boccherini. His critical editions of a previously unpublished works by Boccherini, issued by HH Edition, were critically acclaimed.

From 2004-2016, Pascoe was conductor of the Cork Symphony Orchestra. From 2016 he has been conductor of the Cork Fleischmann Symphony Orchestra.

References

External links
 Vanbrugh Quartet
 Edition HH
 City of Cork Symphony Orchestra
 Home Page

1959 births
People from Cork (city)
Alumni of the Royal College of Music
Alumni of University College Cork
English classical violinists
British male violinists
English conductors (music)
British male conductors (music)
Living people
Musicians from Liverpool
21st-century British conductors (music)
21st-century classical violinists
21st-century British male musicians
Male classical violinists